USS Reasoner (FF-1063) was a  of the United States Navy, named in honor of 1st Lt. Frank S. Reasoner, awarded the Medal of Honor posthumously in the Vietnam War.

Construction 
Reasoner was laid down 6 January 1969, by Lockheed Shipbuilding and Construction Company, Seattle, Washington, and launched 1 August 1970, cosponsored by Mrs. James C. Curry and Mrs. Robert Svingen. Reasoner was commissioned 31 July 1971, Cmdr. Francisco Velazquez-Suarez, USN, commanding. Her hull number, originally DE-1063, was changed in 1975.

Class design and description
They displaced  at full load. Their crew consisted of 13 officers and 211 enlisted men.

The warships were equipped with one Westinghouse geared steam turbine that drove the single propeller shaft.

The Knox-class ships were armed with a 5"/54 caliber Mark 42 gun forward and a single 3-inch/50-caliber gun aft. They mounted an eight-round RUR-5 ASROC launcher between the 5-inch (127 mm) gun and the bridge. Close-range anti-submarine defense was provided by two twin  Mk 32 torpedo tubes. The ships were equipped with a torpedo-carrying DASH drone helicopter; its telescoping hangar and landing pad were positioned amidships aft of the mack. Beginning in the 1970s, the DASH was replaced by a SH-2 Seasprite LAMPS I helicopter and the hangar and landing deck were accordingly enlarged. Most ships also had the 3-inch (76 mm) gun replaced by an eight-cell BPDMS missile launcher in the early 1970s.

Service history
Reasoner first deployed with HSL 31 "Lamps" SH2D in 1973 to Southeast Asia and took part in Operation End Sweep (the removal of mines in Haiphong Harbor). Reasoner was decommissioned on 28 August 1993, and subsequently leased to Turkey, where the ship was recommissioned as Kocatepe. On 22 February 2002, she was finally purchased by Turkey. On 4 May 2005, the ship was used as a target and sunk in the Mediterranean Sea.

In popular culture
The warship was featured in 1979 music video for The Village People single "In the Navy".

Awards and decorations
Joint Meritorious Unit Award
Navy Unit Commendation
Navy Meritorious Unit Commendation
Navy "E" Ribbon (2)
Navy Expeditionary Medal
National Defense Service Medal w/service star
Armed Forces Expeditionary Medal w/bronze star
Southwest Asia Service Medal w/bronze star
Humanitarian Service Medal w/bronze star
Navy Sea Service Deployment Ribbon
Kuwait Liberation Medal (Kuwait)

Notes

References

External links

DANFS - Reasoner
NavSource- FF-1063

Ships built by Lockheed Shipbuilding and Construction Company
Knox-class frigates
1970 ships
Ships transferred from the United States Navy to the Turkish Navy
Ships sunk as targets
Cold War frigates and destroyer escorts of the United States